The Anti-Rent War (also known as the Helderberg War) was a tenants' revolt in upstate New York in the period 1839–1845. The Anti-Renters declared their independence from the manor system run by patroons, resisting tax collectors and successfully demanding land reform.

Events
The incident began with the death of Stephen Van Rensselaer III in 1839. Van Rensselaer, who was described as a "lenient and benevolent landowner" was the patroon of the region at the time. As a way to develop his vast landholdings, Van Rensselaer granted tenants lifetime leases at moderate prices. During his life, when tenants were in financial constraints, he preferred to accept rent in the form of goods and services in lieu of cash, allow rents to accumulate, or accept partial payment rather than evict them. However, his leases also included a "quarter-sale" provision, which required tenants who sold their leases to pay Van Rensselaer one fourth of the sale price or one additional year's rent. The patroons owned all the land on which the tenants in the Hudson Valley lived, and used this feudal lease system to maintain control of the region. When he died, his wealth had been reduced in the economic downturn known as the Panic of 1837, so Van Rensselaer's will directed his heirs to collect outstanding rents and "quarter sale" payments to apply to his estate's debts. When the heirs attempted to collect, tenants who believed their debts would be forgiven at Van Renselaer's death could not pay the amounts demanded, could not secure a favorable payment schedule from the heirs, and could not obtain relief in the courts, so they revolted.

The first mass meeting of tenant farmers leading to the Anti-Rent War was held at the top of the Helderberg mountains in Berne, New York on July 4, 1839. They issued a declaration of independence, promising: "We will take up the ball of the Revolution where our fathers stopped it and roll it to the final consummation of freedom and independence of the masses."

In December 1839 the Anti-Renters repulsed a 500-man posse led by Albany County sheriff Michael Artcher and including William Marcy and John Van Buren. Governor William Seward threatened the rebels with 700 militiamen and obtained their surrender. However, an insurrection continued to smolder. Disguised "Calico Indians" resisted tax collection and law enforcement, sometimes tarring and feathering their enemies.

In January 1845, one hundred and fifty delegates from eleven counties assembled at St. Paul's Lutheran Church in Berne to call for political action to redress their grievances.

Results
The Anti-Rent War led to the creation of the Antirenter Party, which had a strong influence on New York State politics from 1846–51.  Newly elected governor Silas Wright moved in 1845 to stamp out the Calico Indians, and pushed for a law which outlawed disguises.

Trials of leaders of the revolt, charged with riot, conspiracy and robbery, were held in 1845 with Amasa J. Parker presiding. Attorneys included Ambrose L. Jordan, as leading counsel for the defense, and John Van Buren, the state attorney general, who personally conducted the prosecution. At the first trial, the jury came to no conclusion and Parker declared a mistrial. During a re-trial in September 1845, the two attorneys started a fistfight in open court. Both were sentenced by the presiding judge, John W. Edmonds, to "solitary confinement in the county jail for 24 hours." At the conclusion of the trial, one defendant, Smith A. Boughton, was sentenced to life imprisonment. After the election of John Young as governor with the support of the Anti-Renters, he pardoned Boughton.

John Van Steenburgh and Edward O'Connor were sentenced to death by hanging for their involvement in the shooting of Undersheriff Osman Steele, an incident that took place at Moses Earle's farm in Andes, New York during a sheriff's sale after Earle was unable to pay his rent.  Earle and two others were sentenced to life in prison.  Several others received lesser prison sentences.  Governor Young later commuted the death sentences to life in prison.

The New York Constitution of 1846 added provisions for tenants' rights, abolishing feudal tenures and outlawing leases lasting longer than twelve years. The remaining manors dissolved quickly as the patroons sold off the lands.

People involved
 Smith A. Boughton, Anti-Rent leader
 John W. Edmonds, judge who presided at Anti-Rent leader trials
 Ambrose L. Jordan, defense counsel at trials of Anti-Rent leaders.
 William Marcy, participated in posse to end Anti-Renter insurrection.
 Edward O'Connor, Anti-Renter who was convicted for murdering Undersheriff Osman Steele. He was sentenced to death, which was later commuted to life in prison.
 Amasa J. Parker, judge who presided at trials of Anti-Rent leaders,
 William Seward, governor at start of Anti-Rent rebellion who took steps to end it.
 John I. Slingerland, state legislator and U.S. Congressman, was an advocate for the tenants during the Anti-Rent War.
 John Van Buren, took part in posse that attempted to end Anti-Renter insurrection, prosecutor at trials of Anti-Renter leaders.
 Lawrence Van Deusen, president of the Anti-Rent Association of Albany County, New York.
 Stephen Van Rensselaer IV, heir to the Manor of Rensselaerswyck. His efforts to collect past due rents and refusal to negotiate with Anti-Renters was the primary cause of the dispute.
 John Van Steenburgh, Anti-Renter who was convicted for murdering Undersheriff Osman Steele. He was sentenced to death, which was later commuted to life in prison.
 Silas Wright, A Democrat who was governor prior to John Young, his efforts to end the Anti-Rent rebellion led to the election of Young, who was the nominee of the Whig Party. 
 John Young, governor following the trials of the Anti-Rent leaders, he granted a pardon to Smith Boughton and commutations to other participants.

See also
 Anya Seton's novel Dragonwyck (1944) is set during the Anti-Rent War.
 List of incidents of civil unrest in the United States
 Manor of Rensselaerswyck, for further information on how the following years convinced landed proprietors to sell out their interests
 Andes, New York

References

Further reading

 .
 .
 .
 Miller, Douglas T. (1967) Jacksonian Aristocracy: Class and Democracy in New York, 1830–1860. New York: Oxford University Press.
 .

1839 establishments in New York (state)
1845 disestablishments in New York (state)
1830s conflicts
1840s conflicts
1830s in New York (state)
1840s in New York (state)
19th-century rebellions
Political history of New York (state)
Rebellions in the United States
Housing in New York (state)
Housing protests
Tarring and feathering in the United States